Butterflies is a British sitcom written by Carla Lane that aired on BBC2 from 10 November 1978 to 19 October 1983, with each series repeated on BBC1 a few months after the original transmissions.

The subject, the day-to-day life of the comfortable middle-class Parkinson family, is treated in a bittersweet style. There are traditional comedy themes (such as Ria's terrible cooking, and various family squabbles) as well as other more serious themes such as Ria's unconsummated relationship with the outwardly-successful Leonard. Ria is still in love with her husband, Ben, and has raised two teenage sons, yet finds herself unhappy and dissatisfied with her life and in need of something more. Throughout the series, Ria searches for that "something more", and finds some solace in her unconventional friendship with Leonard. In a 2002 interview, Carla Lane explained, "I wanted to write a comedy about a woman seriously contemplating adultery."

In the first episode, an expository discussion between Ria and Leonard alludes to the significance of the series' title: "We are all kids chasing butterflies. You see it, you want it, you grab it, and there it is, all squashed in your hand." She adds, "I am one of the few lucky ones, I have a pleasant house, a pleasant man and two pleasant sons. My butterfly didn't get squashed." Ria's husband Ben collects and studies butterflies.

Cast and setting

The show stars Wendy Craig as Ria Parkinson, a frustrated 'stay-at-home' housewife, and Geoffrey Palmer as her reserved and hard-working dentist husband, Ben, who is also an amateur lepidopterist. Ria's early dialogue in the first series suggests her age as early 40s, whereas her husband, Ben, describes himself as "the wrong side of 45". Ben is a typically traditional, conservative white-collar professional, ill-at-ease with his sons' lack of work ethic and carefree, rebellious attitudes whilst remaining unaware of his wife's impending midlife crisis. They have been married for 19 years and are depicted as having a comfortable lifestyle, supported by one breadwinner in the household at a time in British history when 'stay-at-home' housewives were becoming less common. Ria's disastrous attempts at cooking are a recurring gag.

The Parkinsons have two teenaged sons, both of driving age (at least 17 years of age under UK law in 1978) and unemployed (in 1978, youth unemployment was increasing). Their younger son Adam is played by Nicholas Lyndhurst, and their elder son Russell by Andrew Hall. Throughout all four series, there is a continuing subplot running in tandem with the main storyline, tracking the difficulties faced by young adolescent men coming of age in the UK at a time when there were relatively few employment opportunities. Both of the Parkinson sons are seen making fun of their father's traditional post-war reserved British attitude, whilst also facing their own issues such as unemployment, girlfriend troubles, cannabis use against the wishes of their horrified father, and teenage pregnancy, when Russell fathers a child with his on-off girlfriend. Bruce Montague plays Ria's friend Leonard, a successful businessman aged 44, whose wife has recently left him; he, like Ria, is approaching a midlife crisis. The show also featured two recurring minor characters: Leonard's chauffeur and confidant Thomas (Michael Ripper) and the Parkinsons' cleaner, Ruby (Joyce Windsor), who often lends Ria an ear.

Theme song and music
The Butterflies theme song, "Love Is Like a Butterfly", is a 1974 single written and originally recorded by American country music artist Dolly Parton. The cover version used at the opening of each episode was recorded for the series by Clare Torry, with a band conducted by BBC TV composer Ronnie Hazlehurst.

The Adagio in G minor attributed to Tomaso Albinoni was used as interlude music in most of the episodes where Ria is reflecting on her dilemma, and walking through a park on her own. It is a bittersweet twist on two partners, once very much in love, whose marriage is actually breaking down, but this is not recognised by the husband who is totally engrossed in his work and profession.

Ria starts a romance with another man, which is initially seen by the viewer as a virtual image (almost like a thought bubble in a cartoon) as she walks through the park. He later turns out to be real. The Adagio is used as a "filler" for the lack of script.

Continuity
The Parkinson's address is confirmed as 11 Jade Road in the season 3 episode "Gimme Shelter". However, this had changed to 27 Jade Road by the season 4 episode "Cleaning Windows".

Filming locations
Unlike most Carla Lane sitcoms, Butterflies is not set in Liverpool, but in the prosperous town of Cheltenham, Gloucestershire. (Ben refers to this in the final episode, "Loose Ends." Although the Parkinsons live in Jade Road, this is a fictitious address, actually filmed at 30 Bournside Road). Many of the exterior scenes were filmed in Cheltenham, including the High Street, Montpellier and Hatherley Park. Exterior shots for the Parkinson house were filmed at 30 Bournside Road in Up Hatherley, Cheltenham. Locations included properties along Bournside Road, Lansdown Road and Christchurch Road in Cheltenham, and that town's Hatherley Park, Pittville Park, Imperial Gardens and Neptune's Fountain; High Street; The Promenade, Montpellier; Peter's Bar, 23 Montpellier Walk, which later became J.J. O'Neill's; and Presto Supermarket, Grosvenor Terrace, which later became Bannatyne's Health and Fitness. The apparent office block that could often be seen behind the Parkinson's house at 30 Bournside Road was, in fact, the rear of the catering block of the then North Gloucestershire College of Technology in The Park, Cheltenham, and is now a housing estate.

Episodes 
The series comprises twenty-eight episodes.

Christmas sketch (1982)
An eight-and-a-half-minute sketch aired as part of a Christmas special called The Funny Side of Christmas on BBC1 on 27 December 1982. The family are happy for a seasonal excuse to avoid eating Ria's food. She reveals to Adam privately that Leonard has gone to New York, but he is instead outside in his car, until Thomas reminds him that his former wife is waiting for him at home. Leonard calls Ria on the home phone and Adam answers. Asking for Ria, Leonard is told that Ria is kissing Ben under the mistletoe. When Ria gets to the phone, Leonard hears her voice and hangs up without speaking.

Special for Children in Need (2000)
In November 2000, the cast (save for Michael Ripper who had recently died) reunited for a 13-minute episode in aid of Children in Need.  The premise is Ria's 60th birthday and the lack of change to her situation. Her son Adam is married and has a primary-school-aged daughter named Sophie. Russell however, has no interest in settling down.

American series pilot (1979)
An American remake was piloted but never commissioned. NBC broadcast the pilot in August 1979, with little change to the original scripting. It starred Jennifer Warren as Ria Parkinson and John McMartin as her husband, Ben Parkinson. Film actor Jim Hutton was featured as Leonard Dean in this version. It was Hutton's last acting job. He died suddenly from liver cancer at the age of 45 in June 1979, several weeks before the pilot aired.

DVD release 
All episodes of Butterflies are available on DVD in the UK, distributed by Acorn Media UK. Only the first two series are available in the US.

References

External links 

 Comedy Guide

Butterflies at Phill.co.uk

1978 British television series debuts
1983 British television series endings
1970s British sitcoms
1980s British sitcoms
BBC television sitcoms
English-language television shows
Midlife crisis in television
Television series about brothers
Television series about marriage
Television shows set in Gloucestershire